The Dēnglóng, or Wàngtiānhǒu, Cháotiānhǒu, or simply Hǒu is a Chinese legendary creature.

History  
Legend has it that Denglong is one of the sons of the Dragon King, and has the habit of guarding.  Used on Huabiaos, it symbolises sending the will of heaven to humans, and delivering the conditions of the people to the heavens. There is also legend that says Avalokiteśvara rides on a Denglong, thus the name Chaotianhou.  In Accounts of Marvels, it recounts Denglong as a creature from East China Sea, it can eat the brains of dragons, hover in mid-air, and is very fierce.  When it is in a fight with a dragon, it spews flames for few dozens of feet, and defeats the dragon.  In the 25th year of Kangxi, during the summer, 3 Jiaolong and 2 dragons were sighted fighting one Denglong, and after killing a dragon and two Jiaolong, the Denglong was killed and fell to a valley.  It was ten or twenty feet long, resembled a horse, and had scales.  After it died, the scales went up in flames, and thus was a Denglong.

Characteristics 
The Denglong has ten characteristics that resembles animals: horns like a deer, head like a camel, ears like a cat, eyes like a shrimp, mouth like a donkey, hair like a lion, neck like a snake, belly like a Shen, scales like a koi, front paws like an eagle, and rear paws like a tiger.

Symbolism 
For status, Denglong resides up on the centre of the universe, where there is two lotuses, right-side-up and upside down, where there are Sumeru with Buddhist prayers beads, thus Denglong is considered the master of all.

For righteousness, Denglong brings celestial phenomena portending peace and prosperity, thus is paid service by many Emperors in history.  By having Denglong at their side, Kings can be helped distinguish the righteous and the evil, ensure the country is prosperous, and the kingdom long-lasting.  After the Emperor has passed away, Denglong stays by his side and helps the communication between the living and the dead, helping the Emperor to pass on to another reincarnation.  Therefore, Denglong is considered a model for the righteousness and moral.

For function, Denglong is worship as the greatest creature in China because it helps to drive away evil from its master, defend against ill-meaning wishes, takes away bad fortune, gathers and guards money.  That is why Denglong is on the Huabiao in Tiananmen Square, and worship alongside the spirits of the world and ancestors of people of all generations

See also

 Buraq
 Vahana

Chinese legendary creatures
Buddhist legendary creatures